Jujubinus rubioi is a species of sea snail, a marine gastropod mollusk in the family Trochidae, the top snails.

Description
The height of the shell attains 6 mm.

Distribution
This species occurs in the Atlantic Ocean off the Cape Verde Islands.

References

 Rolán E., 2005. Malacological Fauna From The Cape Verde Archipelago. Part 1, Polyplacophora and Gastropoda

rubioi
Gastropods of Cape Verde
Gastropods described in 2001